Krystyna Antonina Łyczywek (24 August 1920 – 22 April 2021) was a Polish photographer, translator, and journalist. She was awarded a Golden Medal for Merit to Culture in 2010 and made an Officer of the Legion of Honour in 2013.

References

1920 births
2021 deaths
Polish photographers
Polish translators
Polish journalists
Polish centenarians
Polish women photographers
Women centenarians
Home Army members
Adam Mickiewicz University in Poznań alumni
Recipients of the Gold Medal for Merit to Culture – Gloria Artis
Officiers of the Légion d'honneur
People from Poznań
People from Szczecin